Manuel Komnenos (– 17 April 1071) was a Byzantine aristocrat and military leader, the oldest son of John Komnenos and brother of the future emperor Alexios I Komnenos. A relative by marriage of Emperor Romanos IV Diogenes, he was placed in charge of expeditions against Turkish raids from 1070, until his sudden death by illness in April 1071.

Origin and marriage
Manuel was the first-born child of John Komnenos and his wife Anna Dalassene. The date of his birth is unknown, but he was described as a youth in 1068, so he must have been born around 1045.

In 1057, his uncle, Isaac I Komnenos, became emperor, but abdicated in 1059 and was succeeded by Constantine X Doukas after Manuel's father refused to take the throne. Manuel's mother, Anna Dalassene, refused to acquiesce to her husband's decision, however, and developed a deep enmity towards the Doukas family. After John died in 1067, she began plotting against the Doukai with the ultimate aim of raising one of her sons to the throne. She thus backed the assumption of power by Romanos IV Diogenes, and soon after, married both Manuel and his sister Theodora to relatives of the new emperor as a sign of their political alliance. The couple had at least one daughter, most likely named Anna after Manuel's mother.

Military career and death
The emperor also gave Manuel the military rank of —a dignity that by this time had grown in importance sufficiently to only be awarded to individuals of exceptionally high social standing. In this capacity, Manuel confronted the raids of the Seljuq Turks into eastern Asia Minor. In one skirmish in 1070, he foolhardily pressed ahead to the Turkish camp, and was captured after a bitter struggle. His loss led to the defeat of his army and the capture of his two lieutenants and brothers-in-law, Michael Taronites and Nikephoros Melissenos. Brought before the Turkish leader, a certain Chrysoskoulos, Manuel managed to inflame his ambition and raise him in revolt against his nominal sovereign, Sultan Alp Arslan. Indeed, Chrysoskoulos accompanied his captives to the Byzantine capital, Constantinople, where Romanos IV received them with much honour.

In spring 1071, Manuel and Chrysoskoulos went on campaign together against the Seljuqs, but in Bithynia Manuel fell severely ill with an ear infection. His mother hurried to his side at the monastery of Theotokos of Alypos on Mount Azalas, but arrived barely in time for him to bid her farewell before he died. According to the early 12th-century  (foundational charter) of the Monastery of Christ Philanthropos, founded by Empress Irene Doukaina, wife of Manuel's younger brother Alexios I Komnenos, he died on 17 April (the day when he is commemorated).

References

Sources
 
 
 
 
 

1040s births
1071 deaths
11th-century Byzantine military personnel
Byzantine people of the Byzantine–Seljuk wars
Byzantine prisoners of war
Manuel
Kouropalatai
Protostratores